Dehnow is a village in Dehpir Rural District, in the Central District of Khorramabad County, Lorestan Province, Iran. At the 2006 census, its population was 106, in 21 families.

References 

Towns and villages in Khorramabad County